The Tanzanian Defense Force uses a British Army Style ceremonial outfit, and a jungle camouflage. The Identification between different branches in the Tanzania Army depends on the color of the stripe on the shoulders and the color of the beret. Due to shortages of uniform suppliers in the past, there is still some variations in uniforms between ranks in the Army however, these are the most common issue.

Army

Navy

Airforce

Army Ceremonial

See also
Tanzania People's Defence Force
Tanzania Naval Command
Tanzania Air Force Command

References

Military of Tanzania
Military uniforms